was a Japanese rakugoka and musician who performed the works of Katsura Bunji X and performed in the jazz band Newoirans.

Biography
Katsura Shinnosuke was born  on 16 May 1952 in Shibuya, Tokyo. He adopted the name Katsura Shinnosuke in April 1976 after being promoted to futatsume, and was promoted to star performer in May 1986.

His performances of his first master's works were described as "clever" and "indispensable". He was a member of the rakugo jazz band , for whom he was the pianist. His rakugo performances included Chōtan, Rokurokkubi, and Sanada Kozō, and Chihaya Furu was his final performance on 14 December 2019.

Katsura was admitted to the Itabashi Hospital at the Nihon University School of Medicine, where he died on 1 January 2020, aged 67, from acute myeloid leukemia.

Personal life
He married , who survived him.

References

1952 births
2020 deaths
Comedians from Tokyo
Deaths from cancer in Japan
Deaths from leukemia
Japanese male pianists
Japanese jazz pianists
Male jazz pianists
Musicians from Shibuya
Rakugoka